The 1909 Holy Trinity Hilltoppers football team represented the Holy Trinity College during the 1909 college football season. The team posted a 7–3 record and won the North Texas Interscholastic Association.

Schedule

References

Holy Trinity
Dallas Hilltoppers football seasons
Holy Trinity Hilltoppers football